Castiarina turneri Barker 1983 is a beetle (Order Coleoptera) in the Family Buprestidae, otherwise known as jewel beetles. The species was described by Dr Shelley Barker, OAM (Medallion of the Order of Australia), in 1983.

Distribution
South Australia, Victoria and NSW.

Citation
Castiarina turneri Barker, 1983

References
Barker, S., 2006: Castiarina: Australia's richest jewel beetle genus. Australian Biological Resources Study, 2006. 

Notes

External links
 http://bie.ala.org.au/species/Castiarina+turneri#
 https://sites.google.com/site/buprestidpages/castiarina-turneri

turneri
Beetles of Australia
Fauna of New South Wales
Fauna of Queensland
Fauna of Victoria (Australia)